A methadone clinic, or substance use disorder services clinic (SUDS), is a clinic which has been established for the dispensing of medications used in the treatment of opiate dependence —historically and most commonly methadone, although buprenorphine is also increasingly prescribed. Medically assisted drug therapy treatment is indicated in patients who are opioid-dependent or have a history of opioid dependence. Methadone is a schedule II (USA) opioid analgesic, that is also prescribed for pain management. It is a long-acting opioid that can delay the opioid withdrawal symptoms that patients experience from taking short-acting opioids, like heroin, and allow time for detoxification. In the United States, by law, patients must receive methadone under the supervision of a physician, and dispensed through an opioid treatment program certified by Substance Abuse and Mental Health Services Administration and registered with the Drug Enforcement Administration.

Regulation and policy
In the United States, there are approximately 1500 methadone clinics that are federally certified opioid treatment programs. There are generally two types of methadone clinics, public and private. The public clinics are generally cheaper to attend. However, there is usually a waiting list due to limited funding. The private clinics are more expensive to attend but usually have either a short or no waiting list. In many parts of the United States, methadone clinics are few and far between, which presents problems for addicts seeking methadone treatment who live far from a clinic. The greatest concentrations of clinics are in California, Maryland, New York, and New Jersey. All methadone clinics must register as an accredited opioid treatment program with the Substance Abuse and Mental Health Service Administration and renew yearly or every three years based on the accreditation time frame awarded. Additionally, methadone clinics must register with the Drug Enforcement Administration before methadone can be dispensed. While not restricted to adults, this treatment method is generally not considered for people under the age of 18.

Methadone clinics in the United States operate under strict regulations by state and federal laws. Before entering treatment, a patient must be given adequate information to provide informed consent about starting treatment. This information includes reasons for treatment and recommendations, the side effects and risks of treatment, and rules that must be followed to receive methadone treatment. After a physician ensures that the patient voluntarily chooses to receive treatment through a consent form, treatment planning can begin. The patient must show current addiction to an opioid, using accepted medical criteria such as those listed in the DSM-5 and have evidence that he or she became addicted at least 1 year before admission for treatment. Before administration of treatment, a clinical evaluation is required asking about drug use history, co-occurring disorders, and impact of substance use on life,  along with providing information about the treatment goals and guidelines. A medical evaluation is also given in the form of a urinalysis test, a review of past and current health history, and a test for certain conditions which are known to be prevalent in addict populations, such as HIV, hepatitis, and tuberculosis. The medication is monitored by nursing staff and is prescribed by a physician. As of 2013, due to the strict changes in receiving prescription pain medication as well as decreases in non-medical prescription use, the requirements to be accepted into methadone clinics have changed in areas such as New York State.

Use of methadone clinics
Methadone clinics can provide methadone for on-site administration. Additionally, some methadone clinics provide the following: oversight of treatment, observed dosing, consultation services, urine drug test, naloxone distribution, mental health services, primary care services, and HIV and HCV services.

Although not required by regulation at this time in the United States, people are usually encouraged to attempt other types of treatment methods before entering methadone treatment programs. Since its use began in the 1960s, methadone is still the preferred choice of treatment at the clinics, and is often part of other protocols. The National Institute on Drug Abuse (NIDA) provides the protocol of how to treat addiction with recommended options including medication assisted treatment, cognitive behavioral therapy (CBT), and medical detox. Other than methadone, newer medications with fewer side effects including buprenorphine and naltrexone have been introduced, relieve drug cravings, block opioid effects, and avoid physical dependence. CBT is an individualized treatment plan that allow therapists to explore patterns of maladaptive substance use to help generate alternative behavior skills. Medical detox ensures safety and comfort by providing long-term monitoring until the symptoms of withdrawals are over.

An important part of treatment for addiction is counseling. Methadone clinics are only for recovering addicts from opioids. Clinics require attendance at counseling groups as well as individual counseling contacts. It is generally accepted that the more intensive the counseling contacts the individual is willing to submit to, the higher the success rate of the program.
Also, an integral part of counseling is on preventing the exposure and transmission of HIV. Clinics should be able to provide or refer patients to various services: community resources, vocational rehabilitation, education, employment, and prenatal-care. There is no set guideline for duration of methadone treatment, however, longer treatments are associated with better outcomes. Patients receiving methadone treatment in a closed setting should be assisted when transferring to a community-based setting. Patients who voluntarily decide to stop methadone treatment should speak to their provider to discuss why they want to stop and other treatment options.

Effectiveness
While methadone clinics are generally considered to be effective treatment options for patients addicted to opioids, especially when other interventions have failed, there is controversy surrounding the placement of methadone clinics.  There is a perception that the presence of the clinics attracts crime to surrounding areas. However, one study by the University of Maryland School of Medicine found that is not the case, crime rates do not increase when a methadone clinic is opened. Another study by University of Pennsylvania found within a 200 m radius, the presence of a methadone clinic causes a significant decrease in property and total crime but a significant increase in drug and violent crime. A 2004 GAO study notes that placement of clinics can impede recovery and exacerbate relapse:

“Although these clinics are intended to help those in need of rehabilitation, patients who seek treatment must navigate their way to and from the clinics in an environment in which illegal sales of narcotics are daily occurrences. The efforts of patients who are seeking rehabilitation, and clinic professionals who serve them, are significantly undermined by this criminal activity that surrounds them."

Between 70-90% of patients who discontinue methadone maintenance will relapse. The high relapse rate may be partially due to the severity of cases seen at methadone clinics, as well as the long-term effects of opioid use. Some patients stay on methadone for the rest of their lives, which generates criticism regarding the effectiveness of the clinics. Supporters argue that the clinics aim not just to eliminate narcotic addictions, but also to help people function in their lives.

Methadone clinics may decrease the use of emergency rooms by patients addicted to opioids
According to a 2009 Cochrane review, methadone maintenance treatments decreased the likelihood that heroin dependent patients would use heroin, but did not change crime or mortality rates.
However, the bulk of the current research supports the hypothesis that methadone clinics do in fact reduce overdose and substance-related crime.

References

Substance dependence
Drug rehabilitation
Clinics